Byas-Kyuyol (Bes Küöl) is a rural locality (a selo), the only inhabited locality, and the administrative center of Charinsky National Rural Okrug of Olyokminsky District in the Sakha Republic, Russia, located  from Olyokminsk, the administrative center of the district. Its population as of the 2010 Census was 215, of whom 109 were male and 106 female, down from 266 as recorded during the 2002 Census.

References

Notes

Sources
Official website of the Sakha Republic. Registry of the Administrative-Territorial Divisions of the Sakha Republic. Olyokminsky District. 

Rural localities in Olyokminsky District